Thorsten Burkhardt (born 21 May 1981 in Bonn) is a German footballer.

References

External links
  
 

1981 births
Living people
German footballers
Germany under-21 international footballers
Germany youth international footballers
Bayer 04 Leverkusen players
Bayer 04 Leverkusen II players
SpVgg Greuther Fürth players
SV Wacker Burghausen players
Alemannia Aachen players
SV Wehen Wiesbaden players
2. Bundesliga players
3. Liga players
Sportspeople from Bonn
Association football midfielders
Footballers from North Rhine-Westphalia